The 2017 Suffolk County Council election took place on 4 May 2017 as part of the 2017 local elections in the United Kingdom. All 75 councillors were elected from 63 electoral divisions, which returned either one or two county councillors each, by first-past-the-post voting, for a four-year term of office.

Voters who live in divisions which elected two councillors (12 divisions) were entitled to cast a maximum of two votes, while those living in divisions only electing one councillor (51 divisions) were only entitled to cast one vote.

Labour and the Conservatives were the only parties fielding candidates in all 63 electoral divisions. The Liberal Democrats had candidates standing in 58 divisions, while the Green Party stood candidates in 46 divisions and UKIP stood candidates in 43 divisions.

Summary
The Conservatives regained much of the ground they lost at the previous election taking a net gain of 15 seats despite only picking up two extra seats in Ipswich.

Labour lost 4 of its 5 seats in Lowestoft but managed to pick up a Sudbury seat that they haven't held since 2009 and remained the main opposition party.

The Lib Dem lost 2 seats and failed to maintain a by election gain in Hadleigh.

The Greens made a net gain of 1, and UKIP lost all their seats.

Government Formation
With 52 seats and a fourth successive victory, the Conservatives were able to form a working majority of 29 in the new Council, with Colin Noble (Row Heath) elected as Council Leader. In May 2018 he was ousted in a party room ballot by cabinet member for waste, fire and the environment Matthew Hicks (Thredling).

Opposition leader Sandy Martin (St John's) stood down after being elected to Parliament in the 2017 general election in June, with Sandra Gage (Rushmere) succeeding him. However, in December 2017 she stood down to be replaced by former deputy group leader Sarah Adams (St John's), who had returned to the council after winning the by-election triggered by Martin's departure.

The Lib Dems and the Greens agreed to form a joint group, with the leadership switching each year, David Wood (Peninsula) the incumbent Lib Dem group leader became the first leader of this new group.

Overall Result

|}

Results by District

Babergh

District Summary

Division Results

Forest Heath

District Summary

Division Results

Ipswich

District Summary

Division Results

Mid Suffolk
District Summary

Division Results

Suffolk Coastal

District Summary

Division Results

St. Edmundsbury

District Summary

Division Results

Waveney

District Summary

Division Results

References

2017
2017 English local elections
2010s in Suffolk